James M. Dickson, sometimes written as James M. Dixon, was a minister, farm owner, and state legislator in Mississippi. He was enslaved from birth. He represented Yazoo County in the Mississippi House of Representatives in 1872 and 1873. He also served as a chancery clerk and on the county school board.

He was enslaved from birth in North Carolina. He became a Methodist Episcopal Church minister and was living in Mississippi prior to the American Civil War. General Adelbert Ames appointed him to the Yazoo County Board of Supervisors in 1869. He testified before a congressional committee about the Democrat Party's campaign of violence and intimidation duringnthe 1875 election in Mississippi (Redeemers).

See also
African-American officeholders during and following the Reconstruction era

References

People from Yazoo County, Mississippi
American freedmen
County supervisors in Mississippi
Members of the Mississippi House of Representatives
School board members in Mississippi
African-American state legislators in Mississippi
African-American politicians during the Reconstruction Era
Year of death missing
Year of birth missing
African-American school board members
Members of the Methodist Episcopal Church